Bai Andrew Antoniou (born 4 June 1997) is an Australian professional footballer who plays as a forward for Rockdale Ilinden.

Club career 
Antoniou played junior football for Sutherland Sharks before joining Sydney FC.

He finished third highest league scorer in the 2016 NPL NSW 2 season with 20 goals.

In 2016, he was promoted to the Sydney FC first team alongside Charles Lokolingoy. On 10 August 2016, Antoniou made his official debut for Sydney, coming off the bench for George Blackwood in 3–0 win over Wollongong Wolves in the FFA Cup.

Antoniou signed with Cypriot First Division side Alki Oroklini in mid 2018. He moved to Cypriot Second Division side Onisilos Sotira on loan in January 2019.

International career
Antoniou has represented Australia under-17, and scored a goal in a loss to Iran in the quarterfinals of the 2012 AFC U-16 Championship.

References

External links

1997 births
Living people
Sydney FC players
Sutherland Sharks FC players
Rockdale Ilinden FC players
Alki Oroklini players
Onisilos Sotira players
National Premier Leagues players
Cypriot First Division players
Cypriot Second Division players
Australian soccer players
Australian people of Greek Cypriot descent
Australia youth international soccer players
Association football forwards